Edward Ferrars is a fictional character in  Jane Austen's 1811 novel Sense and Sensibility. He is the elder of Fanny Dashwood's two brothers and forms an attachment to Elinor Dashwood.

As first described in Sense and Sensibility:
"Edward Ferrars was not recommended to their good opinion by any peculiar graces of person or address.
He was not handsome, and his manners required intimacy to make them pleasing.
He was too diffident to do justice to himself; but when his natural shyness was overcome, his behaviour
gave every indication of an open, affectionate heart. His understanding was good, and his education had
given it solid improvement. But he was neither fitted by abilities nor disposition to answer the wishes
of his mother and sister, who longed to see him distinguished—as—they hardly knew what."

His personality, while it lacks the flash of Marianne Dashwood's romantic interest Willoughby, indicates more fortitude. Despite the good common sense that links him to Elinor, he is able to attach himself to other people and form bonds of friendship and love with ease. He exemplifies great loyalty when he sacrifices his potential happiness with Elinor to honour a promise he made to another girl when he was younger. He and Marianne's future husband Colonel Brandon are both models of great character under unimpressive exteriors. This simplicity makes them rather less three-dimensional than Pride and Prejudices Fitzwilliam Darcy and Emmas Mr. Knightley.

Disinherited by his mother for refusing out of honour to break his engagement to Lucy Steele, he eventually marries Elinor, having been abandoned by Lucy Steele for his brother, now heir to the family property.

Notable portrayals 
 Chetster Stratton in the 1950 NBC miniseries, directed by Delbert Mann.
 Robin Ellis in the 1971 BBC miniseries, directed by David Giles.
 Bosco Hogan in the 1985 BBC miniseries, directed by Rodney Bennet.
 Hugh Grant in the 1995 film adaptation, directed by Ang Lee.
 Ajith Kumar in the 2000 Tamil adaptation Kandukondain Kandukondain
 Dan Stevens in the 2008 BBC miniseries, directed by John Alexander.
 Nicholas D'Agosto as "Edward Ferris" in the 2011 film From Prada to Nada.
 Henry Devas in the 2013 BBC Radio 4 adaptation by Helen Edmundson.

References

External links

Sense and Sensibility at Project Gutenberg

Sense and Sensibility characters
Literary characters introduced in 1811
Fictional gentry